Dinny may refer to:

Dinny Allen (born 1952), retired Gaelic football manager and former dual player
Dinny Barry-Murphy (1904–1973), famous Irish sportsperson
Dinny Cahill (born 1952), Irish hurling manager and former player
Dinny Campbell or John Campbell (rugby) (1889–1966), national representative for Australia in rugby union
Chuck "Dinny" Dinsmore or Charles Dinsmore (1903–1982), Canadian professional ice hockey player
Dinny Doyle or Denis Doyle (born 1900), Irish football wing half
Dinny Falvey, Gaelic footballer from Annascaul in Co Kerry
Dinny Hannon, Irish footballer who played as an inside-right
Dinny Kelleher (born 1902), Australian rules footballer
Dinny Lacey (1890–1923), Irish Republican Army officer during the Irish War of Independence
Dinny Long (born 1949), Irish retired sportsperson
Dinny Love or Eden Love (1909–1991), Australian Rugby Union player
Dinny Lowry (born 1935), Irish soccer player
Dinny Lutge or Denis Lutge (1879–1953), pioneer Australian rugby league and rugby union player
Dinny McGinley (born 1945), Irish Fine Gael politician
Dinny McNamara (1905–1963), American football and baseball player and coach
Dinny Meehan (1889–1920), the leader of the White Hand Gang in the 1910s
Dinny O'Brien or Denis O'Brien (1898–1942), veteran of the Easter Rising, the Irish War of Independence, and the Irish Civil War
Dinny Pails (1921–1986), former Australian tennis champion
 Denis Ryan (footballer) (1916–1980), Australian rules footballer
 Dinny Ryan (hurler) (1927–2009), Irish hurler for Tipperary

See also
Dinny and the Witches, satirical comedy written by William Gibson in 1948
Dinny the Dinosaur or Cabazon Dinosaurs, enormous, sculptured roadside attractions located in Cabazon, California

Dennis
DYNY
Dienné
Dinay
Donnay

Denis (disambiguation)
Danny (disambiguation)
Denney (disambiguation)
Denny (disambiguation)
Dini (disambiguation)
Tinney (disambiguation)